André Tanneberger (born 26 February 1973), better known by his stage name ATB, is a German DJ, musician, and producer of trance music. According to the official world DJ rankings governed by DJ Magazine, ATB was ranked No. 11 in 2009 and 2010, and No. 15 in 2011. In 2011, he was ranked as world No. 1 according to "The DJ List". He is best known for his 1998 single "9 PM (Till I Come)", which was a No. 1 single in the United Kingdom. The song's hook would later be reworked into "Don't Stop!" in 1999 for his debut album, Movin' Melodies, becoming a hit in its own right.

Musical career
Tanneberger started his music career with the dance music group Sequential One. In February 1993, Sequential One released their debut single "Let Me Hear You", followed by "Dance"/"Raving". Singles brought them small financial benefits; André gained the opportunity to organize a mini-studio. In 1994 the band added three new members: Ulrich Poppelbaum, Woody van Eyden and vocalist Morpha. In early 1995 the House Nation label released the group's first album, Dance.

After great success in his native Germany, Sequential One gradually became known elsewhere in Europe. Their second album, Energy issued in Germany, was also released in the Netherlands, Austria, Switzerland and Hungary. Despite this success and growing popularity, two members of the project —Woody van Eyden and Morpha — left in 1998; only André and Ullrich remained in the group. In 1999 Sequential One ceased to exist. Shortly before the collapse, André managed to release the last single "Angels" and the compilation album Decades.

1998–1999: Formation of ATB and Movin' Melodies
In 1998, Tanneberger started a solo project named ATB. His first track under this name was "9 PM (Till I Come)", included on the Movin' Melodies album, which topped the UK Singles Chart in 1999. The track featured a synthesised slide guitar riff that became popular. This guitar sound became the trademark of his early hits. ATB continues to evolve and change with every album. His current style involves more vocals and varied sounds, with frequent pianos.

Despite only releasing a few more singles in the UK, namely "Don't Stop!" and "Killer", he still regularly releases music in his native Germany and in other parts of Europe, where he has scored big hits such as "I Don't Wanna Stop" and his cover of Olive's 1996 hit "You're Not Alone".

2000–2001: Two Worlds
Two Worlds (released in 2000) was his second studio album. It is a two-disc album based upon the concept of different types of music for different moods. The titles of the two CDs are: "The World of Movement" and "The Relaxing World". This album includes two songs featuring Heather Nova: "Love Will Find You" and "Feel You Like a River". The song "Let U Go" featured on "The World of Movement" disc featuring the vocals of Roberta Carter Harrison from the Canadian pop band Wild Strawberries. The song "Enigmatic Encounter" features music from the music project Enigma.

2001–2002: Dedicated and ATC lawsuit
His third album, Dedicated, was released in 2002. It includes two top hits: "Hold You" and "You're Not Alone". The title refers to the September 11 attacks. In 2002 ATB successfully took the ATC's record label to court and sued and were forced to change its name to 'A Touch of Class'.

2003: Addicted to Music
In 2003, ATB released Addicted to Music, which included hits such as "I Don't Wanna Stop" and "Long Way Home". The same year, ATB's first DVD of the same name was released. It featured all his videos, a tour documentary and photographs.

2004: No Silence
ATB's hits "Ecstasy" and "Marrakech", both featuring vocals by Tiff Lacey, were included on the album No Silence (2004). "Marrakech" was also included on the soundtrack for the film Mindhunters.

2005–2006: Seven Years
In 2005, ATB released Seven Years, a compilation album of 20 songs, including all his singles. Additionally, Seven Years includes six new tracks, including the single "Humanity" with Tiff Lacey and the 2005 rework of "Let U Go". Many of ATB's recent albums have featured vocals from Roberta Carter Harrison, singer for the Canadian band Wild Strawberries.

2007-2008: Trilogy
His next album, Trilogy, was released on 4 May 2007. The single "Justify" was released from The DJ 4 in the Mix compilation. The single "Renegade" was released on 12 April 2007, and features Heather Nova. The third single was "Feel Alive", released in July the same year.

In a Trance.nu interview on 11 May 2007, ATB considered "Don't Stop!" to be his worst production to date, and he no longer stands by it, due to it being similar to his first hit, "9 PM (Till I Come)".

2009-2010: Future Memories
The album Future Memories was released on 5 May 2009. "What About Us" was released as the lead single prior to the album's release. Further hit tracks include the collaborations with Tiff Lacey on "My Everything", "Still Here" and "Missing" (a chillout cover of Everything but the Girl's classic).

2011: Distant Earth
On 29 April 2011 Distant Earth was released, followed by Distant Earth Remixed on 16 September 2011.

2012–2016: Contact
On 8 June 2012, Sunset Beach DJ Session 2, was released. On 24 March 2013, ATB announced during A State of Trance 600 Miami at Ultra Music Festival that he planned to release his next album during the second half of 2013. In September ATB posted that he's working on the last track of the album and that the new album will have 24 songs on two CDs. In addition, he announced that he would be bringing the ATB in Concert series to the United States with shows in Los Angeles, San Francisco, Chicago and New York City. Previously ATB had kept the past six ATB in Concert shows in Eastern Europe.

ATB released an album titled Contact on 24 January 2014.

2017–2020: neXt
On February 10 2017, Andre announced through his Facebook account that his upcoming tenth studio album is set to be titled Next (stylized as neXt) and its release date would be April 21, 2017. The album will be available in three versions: standard double-disc CD, Limited Edition Box and 12" double-vinyl package, which could be pre-ordered through Amazon starting with the day of the announcement.

ATB released neXt on 21 April 2017 through Kontor Records.

2021–present: "Your Love (9PM)"
In 2021, a remake of "9 PM (Till I Come)" by ATB, German producer Topic and Swedish singer Alexander 'A7S' Tidebrink was released on Positiva Records. Retitled "Your Love (9PM)", the record charted in Germany and on the UK Official Charts Company Top 75 singles chart (reaching the number 42 position on 5 February 2021).

Personal life
On 6 July 2018, ATB married his second wife, Laura Gabriela.

Discography

 Movin' Melodies (1999)
 Two Worlds (2000)
 Dedicated (2002)
 Addicted to Music (2003)
 No Silence (2004)
 Trilogy (2007)
 Future Memories (2009)
 Distant Earth (2011)
 Contact (2014)
 neXt (2017)

DJ Magazine Top 100 DJs

References

External links

 
 
 

1973 births
Club DJs
Electronic dance music DJs
Eurodance musicians
German dance musicians
German DJs
German house musicians
German techno musicians
German trance musicians
Living people
People from Bezirk Karl-Marx-Stadt
Musicians from Freiberg
Progressive house musicians
Sony Music Publishing artists